Szederkény is a village in Baranya County, Hungary.

Populated places in Baranya County